Indian River is a  tributary of the Manistique River on the Upper Peninsula of Michigan in the United States.

Major tributaries include the Little Indian River, Murphy Creek, Big Murphy Creek, and Smith Creek.

The Indian River is a National Wild and Scenic River, with  designated "Scenic" and  designated "Recreational". This river is popular with paddlers although the section from Hovey Lake to Doe Lake is not maintained for canoes or kayaks and requires many portages. From Doe Lake to Indian Lake is periodically maintained for clear passage by the forest service, but portages may still be required due to the abundance of dead-falls.

References

External links

Indian River National Wild and Scenic River

Rivers of Michigan
Rivers of Alger County, Michigan
Rivers of Schoolcraft County, Michigan
Tributaries of Lake Michigan
Wild and Scenic Rivers of the United States